Albin Camaj (Cyrillic: Aљбин Цaмaj, Albanian: Albin Camaj) (born 29 September 1979 in Titograd) is a Malsor retired Footballer who last played for FK Dečić.

Club career
Camaj played for FK Budućnost Podgorica and FK Kom in the First League of Serbia and Montenegro.

References

1979 births
Living people
Footballers from Podgorica
Albanians in Montenegro
Association football forwards
Serbia and Montenegro footballers
Montenegrin footballers
FK Budućnost Podgorica players
FK Kom players
FK Dečić players
First League of Serbia and Montenegro players
Second League of Serbia and Montenegro players
Montenegrin First League players